The KX414 is a mobile phone from Kyocera.

It is part of the Phantom family of mobile phones from Kyocera.

The only U.S service providers that are carrying the KX414 are U.S. Cellular, Revol Wireless, and Verizon Wireless.

Its successor is the Kyocera KX440/KX444.

External links
KX414 on Phone Scoop
Official Kyocera Page

KX414